Johannes Marinus "Jan" van Halst  (born 20 April 1969) is a former Dutch professional football player and current television show host and sports analyst for Ziggo Sport. He previously held positions as financial manager and general manager of the Dutch football club FC Twente.

On August 13, 2021, it was announced that he would participate in the Dutch TV-show Expeditie Robinson: a well-known survival programme featuring famous Dutch people.

Club career
Jan Van Halst started his youth career at VV Jonathan but then moved to FC Utrecht.

International career
Van Halst made one appearance for the Netherlands national U-21 team when he played the full 90 minutes against Iceland in what ended in a 0–3 loss.

Honours
Ajax
Eredivisie: 2001–02
KNVB Cup: 2001–02

References 

1969 births
Living people
Dutch association football commentators
Dutch footballers
Footballers from Utrecht (city)
FC Utrecht players
FC Wageningen players
FC Twente players
AFC Ajax players
Fortuna Sittard players
SBV Vitesse players
Eredivisie players
Eerste Divisie players
Association football midfielders
FC Twente non-playing staff